Red Hot Speed is a 1929 American comedy film directed by Joseph Henabery and starring Reginald Denny, Alice Day and Charles Byer. It was made during the conversion from silent to sound film, and had talking sequences using the Movietone recording system.

Synopsis
The daughter of a newspaper owner is arrested for speeding. In order to avoid embarrassing her father, who is in the middle of an anti-speeding campaign, she gives a false name to the authorities. She is then turned over to the district attorney who is unaware of her real identity.

Cast
 Reginald Denny as Darrow  
 Alice Day as Buddy Long  
 Charles Byer as George  
 Tom Ricketts as Colonel Long  
 DeWitt Jennings as Judge O'Brien  
 Fritzi Ridgeway as Slavey 
 Hector V. Sarno as Italian father

References

Bibliography
 George A. Katchmer. Eighty Silent Film Stars: Biographies and Filmographies of the Obscure to the Well Known. McFarland, 1991.

External links

1929 films
1929 comedy films
American comedy films
Films directed by Joseph Henabery
1920s English-language films
Universal Pictures films
American black-and-white films
1920s American films